Mehdiabad (also Romanized as Mehdīābād and Mihdīābād) is a village in Ferdows Rural District, Ferdows District, Rafsanjan County, Kerman Province, Iran. At the 2006 census, its population was 1,177, in 319 families.

References 

Populated places in Rafsanjan County